This is a list of Spanish television related events from 1959.

Events
 15 February - For the first time, a football match between Real Madrid and FC Barcelona is broadcast.
 1 April - TVE broadcasts the inauguration of Valley of the Fallen.
 19 March - First Television criticism is published in Spain by the newspaper ABC publishes .
 14 July - Official Inauguration of Miramar TV Studios in Barcelona.
 27 September - Laura Valenzuela, Federico Gallo and Alberto Closas host, from Barcelona, the Mediterranean Song Contest.
 29 November - Artist Lola Flores sings and dances as guess in the Variety Show Gran Parada.
 21 December - TVE broadcasts through the European Broadcasting Union Dwight D. Eisenhower visit to Madrid.

Debuts

Television shows
Telediario (1957- )
 Teatro Apolo (1958-1960)
 Fila cero (1958-1962)

Ending this year
 Aeropuerto Telefunken (1958-1959)
 Club del sábado (1958-1959)
 Hacia la fama (1958-1959)
 Juicio sumarísimo (1958-1959)

Foreign series debuts in Spain 
 Agente X (The Man Called X)
 Cisco Kid.
 Dr. Christian 
 Misterios de la ciencia (Science Fiction Theatre)
 Los patrulleros del Oeste (Tales of the Texas Rangers)
 Topper

Births
 4 February - Juan Manuel López Iturriaga, host.
 19 February - Ana Gracia, actress.
 24 February - Mon Santiso, host.
 15 March - Isabel San Sebastián, journalist.
 23 March - Henrique Cymerman, journalist.
 16 April - Emilio Aragón Álvarez, host, actor and comedian 
 6 May - Julia Otero, journalist.
 10 May - Juanjo de la Iglesia, host.
 21 May - Adriana Ozores, actress.
 29 May - José Manuel Lorenzo, producer  and director General of Antena 3.
 16 June - Gloria Lomana, journalist.
 4 July - Victoria Abril, actress.
 16 July - Ángeles Caso, hostess.
 21 September - Eulalia Ramón, actress.
 26 September - Maribel Ripoll, actress.
 18 December  - María Escario, sport journalist.
 22 December  - Alfredo Urdaci, journalist.

See also
1959 in Spain
List of Spanish films of 1959

References